Yevgeni Panteleimonovich Zhukov (7 December 1950 – 21 November 1990) was a Russian professional footballer.

Club career
He made his professional debut in the Soviet Top League in 1969 for FC Dynamo Moscow.

Honours
 Soviet Top League runner-up: 1970.
 European Cup Winners' Cup 1971–72 finalist (9 games).
 Soviet Cup winner: 1970.

References

1950 births
Footballers from Moscow
1990 deaths
Soviet footballers
FC Dynamo Moscow players
Soviet Top League players
Pakhtakor Tashkent FK players
Association football midfielders
Association football defenders